Erasto Edward Nyoni is a Tanzanian footballer who plays for the Tanzanian club Simba S.C. and the Tanzania national team

International career
Nyoni represents Tanzania at international level.

International goals
Scores and results list Tanzania's goal tally first.

See also
 List of men's footballers with 100 or more international caps

References

External links

1988 births
Living people
People from Dar es Salaam
Association football midfielders
Tanzanian footballers
Tanzania international footballers
Tanzanian expatriate footballers
Expatriate footballers in Burundi
Vital'O F.C. players
Azam F.C. players
simba S.C. players
2019 Africa Cup of Nations players
FIFA Century Club
Tanzanian expatriate sportspeople in Burundi
2009 African Nations Championship players
Tanzania A' international footballers
2020 African Nations Championship players